Hayfa Basil al-Baytar (also transliterated :Haifa Bitar; born 1960) is a Syrian novelist, short story writer and ophthalmologist. She has won the Abi Al Qassem Al Shabbi prize for her collections The Fallen (2000) and The Whore (2003).

Biography and career

Early years 
Hayfa Basil al-Baytar was born in 1960  Latakia under Second Syrian Republic, and raised there, the principal port city of Syria. She finished her primary, middle and high school studies at her hometown, then studied at the Faculty of Medicine at University of Latakia, and graduated in 1982. She continued her postgraduate studies at Al-Mowasat Hospital of Damascus University, where she specialized in ophthalmology, and graduated in 1986. After graduating in Damascus, she returned to her hometown to work as an ophthalmologist in Lattakia Governmental Hospital and her private clinic for many years.

After that, she traveled for a year to Paris to study, and also prepared many studies on the causes of blindness and other diseases in her field of specialization. She also attended courtesy of the Bureau of Educational and Cultural Affairs at the US Department of State.

Literary career 
Her literary career began in the early 1990s, and she has become known as a feminist writer as well as a realist. Her works are also categorized under Arabic and Syrian Feminist and Psychological fiction.

Her first literary work, titled Wurūd lan tamūt, is a collection of stories, published in 1992, and she published another collection titled Qiṣaṣ muhāǧirah in 1993. Her first novel Yawmiyat miṭalaqah was published in 1994. She entered journalism, and wrote social, literary and critical essays published in a number of Syrian and Arab newspapers, magazines, websites and periodicals such as Al-Thawra and As-Safir. Because of her criticism of corruption, she faced problems including censorship of her works in her country. She participated in the first and second conferences, which were held in 2001 and 2002 at Georgetown University in Washington D.C, lectured about the form of women in contemporary Arab literature. She joined the Arab Writers Union in 1994 and was honored by the union officials during The Damascus Spring.

She is known for her social reality style. A Jouhina Magazine journalist described her as a humanist and realist who presents socially-reflected reality in all its aspects, writing, "Her work in medicine has helped her to live with many human cases, and present them in a distinguished manner and literary sense." She is considered to be "a writer who enjoys a style dominated by the spirit of rebellion and daring in her weaving of stories from our contemporary reality." She stated in July 2021 that she likes "to present my truth or my soul honestly to my readers and to the whole world".

At the beginning of the third decade of her literary career, she expressed she was influenced by Dostoevsky, who "I consider him not only the greatest novelist, but the founder of psychology, because he is more important than Freud in my opinion." and loves the writings of "Balzac, Kundera, Henry Miller, Mario Llosa, and others, and among the Arab writers, I love the writings of Tahar Ben Jelloun, Amin Maalouf, Sonallah Ibrahim, Jamal Naji, Abdullah Bin Bakheet and others."

She has been described as an "outspoken" novelist in The New Yorker and has participated in public discussion forums about a variety of topics.

Critical reception
According to Abir Hamdar, writing in The Female Suffering Body: Illness and Disability in Modern Arabic Literature (2014), her work "repeatedly seeks to offer an insight into the gritty reality of women's lives in the Arab world", and her novels and short stories "focus on tragic female characters who suffer social and psychological injury either at the hands of men or because of their own misplaced ideals and aspirations." Her 2004 novel Imraʾa min Hadtha al-ʿAsr features the protagonist Maryam and her experience with breast cancer, with her unsuccessful relationships with men in the background, and became the subject of wide criticism for its inclusion of taboo subjects, including female sexuality.

Her novel A Woman of Fifty has a middle-aged protagonist who engages a lover, whom according to Samira Aghacy, writing in Ageing in the Modern Arabic Novel, "despises older women" and has an attitude that "reveals the 'double standard of ageing' since society is permissive of sexual activity in older men, but more severe and fanatical when it comes to the older women's sexuality." Her 2002 short story The Din of the Body (Dhajeej al-Jasad) focuses on Indou, a Sri Lankan maid subject to a variety of abuses by her female employer.

According to Lovisa Berg, writing in Masculinity and Syrian Fiction: Gender, Society and the Female Gaze, Bitar is one of several writers of her era who "create male characters who perform masculinities perceived by the other characters as one, or a mixture of, the following: weak, oppressive, traditionalist (meant in a negative way), aggressive, feminized, misogynistic or idealistic." Her novel One-Winged Eagle has a male protagonist, a doctor named Karim with financial difficulties despite his profession, which according to Berg, "contrasts the pressure Karim puts on himself with the demands his sister places on men in general to provide for her." In her novel The Abbaseen Basement (1995), the protagonist is the daughter Khulud, who "decides to take revenge on all men because of what her father has done to her mother." Her novel Small Joys - Final Joys (1998) follows the protagonist Hiyam as she lives with a Syrian man in Paris while they both attend graduate school, and after they are married, with a focus on the changing moral views of her husband over time.

Honors and awards
 Abi Al Qassem Al Shabbi prize in Tunisia for her collection The Fallen (2000) 
 Abi Al Qassem Al Shabbi prize in Tunisia for her collection The Whore (2003)

Bibliography 
An Abjjad list of her works:

Short Stories 
 , 1992 
 , 1993 
 , 1993 & 2006, 
 , 1994, 
 , 1995 
 , 1995,  
 , 1996 & 2007, 
 , 1997 
 , 1997 
  also translated as "The Whore", 2000,  
 , 2002, translated as Love Struck by Hannah Benninger, 2014 
 , 2008 
 , 2008 
 , 2008,  
 , 2009, 
 , 2010, 
 , 2016,

Novels 
 , 1994,   
 , 1995, 
 , 1996, 
 , 1998, 
 , 1999, 
 , 2000, 
 , 2006,  
 , 2002, 
 , 2007, 
 , 2007, 
 , 2009, 
 , 2013, 
 , 2013,  
 , 2018,

Non-fiction 
 , 2010,

References

External links 
 2014 Opinion Piece in The New Arab Syria's pampered coast
 2021 writing A Family of Martyrs

1960 births
Living people
21st-century Syrian women writers
21st-century Syrian writers
Syrian novelists
Syrian women novelists
Ophthalmologists
People from Latakia
Tishreen University alumni
Damascus University alumni
Feminist writers
Syrian women short story writers
Syrian short story writers
Syrian essayists
Psychological fiction writers